Göyər Abbas (also, Göyərabas, Gëyarabas, and Geyarbas) is a village in the Qubadli Rayon of Azerbaijan.

References 

Populated places in Qubadli District